Lasiobema was a genus of flowering plants in the legume family, Fabaceae, most of which are lianas, belonging to the subfamily Cercidoideae. It was recently (2010) synonymized with Phanera on the basis of morphology, although this was questioned and it can be treated as a section of this genus.

Species
Lasiobema comprised the following species (several previously placed in Bauhinia):

 Lasiobema championii (Benth.) De Wit
 Lasiobema comosa (W. G. Craib) A. Schmitz
 Lasiobema curtisii (Prain) de Wit
 Lasiobema delavayi (Franch.) A. Schmitz
 Lasiobema dolichobotrys (Merr.) A. Schmitz
 Lasiobema flavum de Wit
 Lasiobema harmsianum (Hosseus) de Wit

 Lasiobema japonicum (Maxim.) de Wit
 Lasiobema penicilliloba (Pierre ex Gagnep) A. Schmitz
 Lasiobema retusum (Roxb.) de Wit
 Lasiobema scandens (L.) de Wit
 var. horsfieldii (Prain) K.Larsen & S.S.Larsen
 var. scandens (L.) de Wit
 Lasiobema strychnoideum (Prain) de Wit
 Lasiobema tubicalyx (Craib) de Wit

Species names with uncertain taxonomic status
The status of the following species is unresolved:
 Lasiobema cardinale (Pierre ex Gagnep.) de Wit
 Lasiobema concreta (Prain) A.Schmitz
 Lasiobema pulla (Craib) A.Schmitz

References

External links
 * 

Cercidoideae